The Connecticut Crushers were a women's American football team based in Hartford, and were a member of the Independent Women's Football League since 2009.  Home games were played at Dillon Stadium.

Prior to 2009, the team was known as the Connecticut Crush and played in the National Women's Football Association.  The name change was done so as not to conflict with fellow IWFL team the Iowa Crush.

Season-by-season 

|-
| colspan="6" align="center" | Connecticut Crush (NWFA)
|-
|2001 || 2 || 6 || 0 || 4th Northern || --
|-
|2002 || 5 || 5 || 0 || 3rd North || --
|-
|2003 || 7 || 3 || 0 || 2nd Northern North || Lost Northern Conference Quarterfinal (D.C.)
|-
|2004 || 5 || 3 || 0 || 3rd Northern North|| -- 
|-
|2005 || 6 || 3 || 0 || 6th Northern || Lost Northern Conference Quarterfinal (Massachusetts)
|-
|2006 || 4 || 4 || 0 || 3rd Northern Northeast || --
|-
|2007 || 6 || 3 || 0 || 2nd Northern North || Lost Northern Conference Quarterfinal (Cleveland)
|-
|2008 || 3 || 5 || 0 || 2nd Northern Northeast || --
|-
| colspan="6" align="center" | Connecticut Crushers (IWFL)
|-
|2009 || 1 || 7 || 0 || 5th Eastern North Atlantic || --
|-
| colspan="6" align="center" | Connecticut Crushers (IWFL2)
|-
|2010 || 1 || 7 || 0 || 6th Eastern Northeast || --
|-
!Totals || 40 || 46 || 0
|colspan="2"| (including playoffs)

Season schedules

2009

** = Won by forfeit

2010

References

Connecticut Crushers official website
IWFL official website

Independent Women's Football League
American football teams in Connecticut
Sports teams in Hartford, Connecticut
American football teams established in 2001
2001 establishments in Connecticut
Women's sports in Connecticut